The Akilam nine  is one of the sub-sections of Akilathirattu Ammanai the Primary scripture of Ayyavazhi. It describes the events taking place immediately before and at the time of incarnation of Vaikundar in the world.

Discussions with Vyakarar
Thirumal discussed with Isurar regarding his birth in the world. After that he called the saint Vyakarar and inquired about the events that took place in the world from the beginnings and also the events that will take place till the end of times. After Vyakarar detailed about these events, he inscribed those in a stone in the Kayilai.

Saints in Tiruchendur
As per the instructions given by Thirumal, many saints reached Chendur with him. After this, Thirumal beget a child in the ocean and sent him into the land of Detchanam for the purpose of destroying Kali. Seeing the arrival of Thirumal in Chendur, Arumugan gave him a warm welcome and requested that everyone stay back in Chendur. Hearing this, Narayanar appreciated the rule of Murugan and called him son-in-law. He then spoke with Isar and reached the shores of Thiruchendur sea.

Incarnation of Vaikundar
When the day came, In Kali yuga, the Lord Narayana himself incarnated as Vaikundar during an encounter with a deity Goddess Lakshmi, he was beget inside the sea and arose from the sea of Tiruchendur on Kollam Year 1008 at 20th day of Tamil Month Masi (1 March 1833 CE, Friday). Lord Vaikundar was born out of the sea of Tiruchendur and Thirumal gave him the fourth Vinchai. Vaikundar took the human form as Pantaram at Tharuvaiyur near seashore, this is considered a unique avatar.

References 

9